Church of Saint Roch or Saint Roch's Church may refer to:

France
Saint-Roch church in Louesme, in Champignelles
Église Saint Roch, Marseille
Church of Saint-Roch, Paris
Saint Roch Church in La-Boulesq, in Pomayrols

Other countries
Saint-Roch Church (Quebec City), Canada
Church of Saint Roch, Žižkov, Prague, Czech Republic
San Rocco, Venice, Italy
St Roque's Church, Mdina, Malta
St Roque's Church, Valletta, Malta
St. Roch's Church, Białystok, Poland
Church of St. Roch (Lisbon),  Portugal
St. Roch Church (Greenwich, Connecticut), United States

See also
 Saint Roch
 Saint-Roch (disambiguation)
 San Rocco (disambiguation)